University of Berlin founded. Johann Karl Wilhelm Illiger is a professor and director of the Zoological Museum.
Constantine Samuel Rafinesque  describes the streaked fantail warbler in  Caratteri di alcuni nuovi generi e nuove specie di animali e piante della Sicilia.
George Perry describes the brolga in Arcana; or the Museum of Natural History. This serial publication, like many was short-lived ( January 1810 to September 1811).
John James Audubon meets Alexander Wilson author of American Ornithology.
Moritz Balthasar Borkhausen publishes Deutsche Ornithologie oder Naturgeschichte aller Vögel Deutschlands (Natural history of German birds).

Ongoing events
Alexander Wilson Ornithology of America (1808–1814) Species described in 1810 include the American tree sparrow, the pine siskin, the blue-headed vireo, the mourning warbler and the marsh wren.

Birding and ornithology by year
1810 in science